Roman Šebrle (born 26 November 1974) is a retired decathlete from the Czech Republic. He is considered to be one of the best decathlon athletes of all time. Originally a high jumper, he later switched to the combined events and is a former world record holder in the decathlon. In 2001 in Götzis he became the first decathlete ever to achieve over 9,000 points, setting the record at 9,026 points, succeeding his compatriot, Tomáš Dvořák, who had scored 8,994 points two years earlier.

After placing second in the decathlon during the 2000 Summer Olympics, Šebrle won the gold medal in the 2004 Summer Olympics. Tradition dictates the winner of the decathlon holds the title of "World's Greatest Athlete".

A panel of experts convened by the Wall Street Journal in 2008 also ranked Šebrle as the world's greatest athlete. That very same year, Šebrle finished 6th in the decathlon in the Beijing Olympics.

Private life
Šebrle was born in Lanškroun, Czechoslovakia. He studied at Gymnázium Františka Martina Pelcla in Rychnov nad Kněžnou and at Gymnázium Pardubice. Then he studied an extension course of Information Science and Computer Technology.

On 14 October 2000 Šebrle married Eva Kasalová, a former Czech athlete who competed on the track in the 400 and 800 metres. Their son, Štěpán, was born on 4 September 2002 and their daughter Kateřina on 30 January 2006.

Sporting career

Beginning
When Roman Šebrle was six years old, he started playing football, but also occasionally took part in athletics competitions. In 1987 he broke his calf bone and shin bone on one leg in a collision with the opponent goalkeeper during a football match. After this incident he had his leg in plaster for 2 months and spent one year learning to walk.

He competed in his first decathlon competition in 1991 in Týniště nad Orlicí, reaching 5,187 points. Then he met coach Jiří Čechák who convinced him to change school from Rychnov nad Kněžnou to Pardubice, where he joined the Track and Field Club in 1992. He improved his decathlon personal best to 7642 points, although he did just light training.

TJ Dukla Praha
In 1995 he started his two-year compulsory military service in the Czech Armed Forces. He joined the army sports club Dukla Prague and its group of decathletes led by coach Zdeněk Váňa, and has stayed a member since that time. Thus he is still automatically a soldier of the Czech army, although in fact he does not take part in any military operations or, with a few exceptions, in any military training.

Achievements
In 1996 Šebrle achieved a score of over 8,000 points for the first time, reaching 8,210 points at a meeting in Prague. His first big success came in 1997, when he won the World University Games in Sicily and came ninth at the World Championships in Athens. In 1999 he was successful at the World Indoor Championships in Maebashi, where he won bronze  in the heptathlon, and one year later at the European Indoor Athletics Championships in Ghent, where he took silver.

By the end of the discus discipline at the 2000 Olympic Games in Sydney, after Estonian Erki Nool was red-flagged three times by the discus judge, it seemed that Roman Šebrle was on course for the gold medal. However, the competition referee overruled the decision and Šebrle finally took silver.

In March 2001 he won the first major tournament – the World Indoor Championships in Lisbon – and in May he shocked the world with a new world record of 9,026 points, marking the first time a decathlete has ever broken the illustrious 9,000 point barrier. However, due to an injury he couldn't do himself justice and finished a disappointed 10th in the World Championships in Edmonton.

Šebrle then left the Váňa's group and started to train with coach Dalibor Kupka in the same club. In 2002 he won both European Indoor Championships in Vienna and European Championships in Munich. In 2004 in Athens he finally won the Olympic Games, reaching 8,893 points and thus beating the 20-year-old Olympic record set by the British decathlete Daley Thompson in the 1984 Olympics in Los Angeles. After the victory in Athens, the Czech minister of defence promoted him to the rank of major.

Šebrle's best World Championships results were gold in 2007 (Osaka) and silver in 2003 (Paris) and 2005 (Helsinki). He was also successful at the World Indoor Championships in heptathlon, taking gold in 2001 (Lisbon) and 2004 (Budapest, beating the European record with 6,438 points), and bronze in 1999 (Maebashi), 2003 (Birmingham) and 2006 (Moscow). In 2005 he won the European Indoor Championships in heptathlon (Madrid), in 2006 the European Championships in decathlon for the second time (Gothenburg) and in 2007 he got his third European indoor gold (Birmingham).

The sum of his personal bests in individual disciplines is 9,326 points (the third ever best after Dan O'Brien and Mike Smith). He is the only decathlete who finished 40 decathlon competitions with the score over 8,000 points and 20 competitions with the score over 8,500 points.
Šebrle was also voted the Best Czech Athlete of the Year five times in a row (2002–2006), and in 2004 he received the title of the Czech Sportsman of the Year. In 2002 he received the Guth-Jarkovský Trophy for his world record, which is awarded by the Czech Olympic Committee for the best performance by a Czech athlete achieved during the previous year.

Javelin injury
On 22 January 2007, Šebrle was hurt by a javelin thrown by a South African female javelin thrower, Sunette Viljoen, from a distance of 55 metres while training in South Africa. The javelin pierced the edge of his right shoulder from the front, 12 cm deep. Shocked, Šebrle ripped the javelin out immediately, which could have caused even more damage. It did not cause any serious injury however, because it slipped between a muscle and his skin. He was taken to a hospital, but left soon with just eleven stitches. However, he was limited in training for some time, especially in the pole vault. Later he stated that he was only 20 cm away from being killed and 1 cm from an injury that would have ended his career.

Personal bests

List of results

References

External links
 
 
 
 
 
 Roman Šebrle - profile at Czech.cz
 "Roman Sebrle", n°8 on Time's list of "100 Olympic Athletes To Watch"

1974 births
Living people
People from Lanškroun
Czech decathletes
Athletes (track and field) at the 2000 Summer Olympics
Athletes (track and field) at the 2004 Summer Olympics
Athletes (track and field) at the 2008 Summer Olympics
Athletes (track and field) at the 2012 Summer Olympics
Olympic athletes of the Czech Republic
Olympic gold medalists for the Czech Republic
Olympic silver medalists for the Czech Republic
Recipients of Medal of Merit (Czech Republic)
World record setters in athletics (track and field)
World Athletics Championships medalists
European Athletics Championships medalists
Medalists at the 2004 Summer Olympics
Medalists at the 2000 Summer Olympics
Olympic gold medalists in athletics (track and field)
Olympic silver medalists in athletics (track and field)
Universiade medalists in athletics (track and field)
Universiade gold medalists for the Czech Republic
World Athletics Indoor Championships winners
World Athletics Championships winners
Czech television presenters
Czech male athletes
Medalists at the 1997 Summer Universiade
Sportspeople from the Pardubice Region